The 1991 Yonex All England Open was the 81st edition of the All England Open Badminton Championships. It was held from March 13 to March 17, 1991, in London, England.

It was a five-star tournament and the prize money was US$125,000.

Venue
Wembley Arena

Final results

Men's singles

Section 1

Section 2

Women's singles

Section 1

Section 2

External links
Smash: 1991 All England Open

All England Open Badminton Championships
All England Open
All England
All England Open Badminton Championships in London
All England Open Badminton Championships
All England Open Badminton Championships